Whites Lake, (Nova Scotia) could mean  the following :

Community
Whites Lake a community in the Halifax Regional Municipality at

Lakes

Guysborough County
 Whites Lake a lake near the community of East Ennville at

Halifax Regional Municipality
 Whites Lake a lake near the first nations reserve Shubenacedie 13 at 
 Whites Lake a lake near the  residential community of Whites Lake at

Richmond
 Whites Lake a lake near the community of Whiteside at

Shelburne County
 Whites Lake a lake near the community of Sable River at

References
Geographical Names Board of Canada
Explore HRM
Nova Scotia Placenames

Lakes of Nova Scotia